Thoscora is a genus of moths in the family Megalopygidae.

Species
Thoscora rubrivena (E. D. Jones, 1912)
Thoscora omayena (Schaus, 1904)
Thoscora brugea (Schaus, 1904)
Thoscora acca (Schaus, 1892)
Thoscora acca aterrima (Hopp, 1930)

References

Megalopygidae
Megalopygidae genera